Acropyrgota is a genus of flies in the family Pyrgotidae.

Species 
A. cribripennis Bezzi, 1929 (Synonym of Cardiacera cribripennis (Bezzi, 1929))
A. flavescens Hendel, 1914

References 

Pyrgotidae
Diptera of Australasia
Brachycera genera
Taxa named by Friedrich Georg Hendel